Unicursal may refer to:
 Eulerian path, a sequential set of edges within a graph that reach all nodes
 Labyrinth, a unicursal maze
 Unicursal curve, a curve which is birationally equivalent to a line
 Unicursal hexagram, a star polygon